Sarah Backhaus Grünewald (born 5 February 1984) is a Danish model, television presenter and actress. She was born in Germany, but was raised in Marielyst on Falster.

In 2013 Sarah Grünewald was chosen as Claus Elming's new member and replacement for Christiane Schaumburg-Müller in Season 10 of Vild med dans. She returned in Season 11.

She has participated in the television series Tomgang and in the films A Funny Man (2010) and Det andet liv (2014).

In 2014 she married boyfriend Rasmus Backhaus. Their son, Luis, was born in March 2016.

References

External links

Sarah Grünewald on the Danish Film Database 
Sarah Grünewald on Danskefilm.dk 
Sarah Grünewald on Scope 
Sarah Grünewald on the Swedish Film Database 

1984 births
Living people
Danish television presenters
Danish female models
German emigrants to Denmark
Danish women television presenters
People from Guldborgsund Municipality